Charles Anthony "Chas" Richard (born 1959) is a retired United States Navy admiral who served as the 11th commander of United States Strategic Command. He previously served as Commander Submarine Forces, Submarine Force Atlantic and Allied Submarine Command.

Early life and education
Richard is a native of Decatur, Alabama, and is a 1982 graduate with honors from the University of Alabama. He has earned master's degrees with honors from the Catholic University of America and the Naval War College.

Naval career

Richard's staff assignments include service as the executive assistant and naval aide to the Under Secretary of the Navy; chief of staff, Submarine Force Atlantic; and command of Submarine Squadron 17 in Bangor, Washington. Other staff assignments include director of resources, Under Secretary of Defense (Policy); squadron engineer of Submarine Squadron 8 and duty on the Deputy Chief of Naval Operations (Submarine Warfare) staff. He has also served as a member of Chief of Naval Operations' Strategic Studies Group XXVIII, studying the integration of unmanned systems into naval force structure.

Flag officer assignments include command of Submarine Group 10 in Kings Bay, Georgia; director of Undersea Warfare (OPNAV N97), Pentagon, and deputy commander, Joint Functional Component Command for Global Strike at United States Strategic Command.

As commander, Submarine Forces, Richard was the undersea domain lead, and was responsible for the submarine force's strategic vision. As commander, Submarine Force Atlantic, he commanded all Atlantic-based United States submarines, their crews and supporting shore activities. These responsibilities also included duties as Commander, Task Force (CTF) 144, CTF 84; commander, Anti-Submarine Warfare (ASW) Forces Western Atlantic; and CTF 46. As commander, Allied Submarine Command, he provided advice to the North Atlantic Treaty Organization Strategic Commanders on submarine related issues.

On October 15, 2019, Richard was nominated for promotion to admiral and reassignment as the commanding officer of United States Strategic Command. He appeared for a hearing before the United States Senate Committee on Armed Services on October 24 and was confirmed by voice vote of the full Senate on October 31. He took over from General Hyten on November 18, 2019. In October 2021, Politico reported that Richard was among the candidates shortlisted to succeed Hyten as vice chairman of the Joint Chiefs of Staff. He retired from active duty on December 9, 2022.

Awards and decorations

References

External links

Biography at U.S. Strategic Command
U.S. Navy Biography

1959 births
Living people
University of Alabama alumni
Military personnel from Alabama
Catholic University of America alumni
United States submarine commanders
Naval War College alumni
Recipients of the Legion of Merit
United States Navy admirals
Recipients of the Defense Superior Service Medal
Recipients of the Navy Distinguished Service Medal
Recipients of the Defense Distinguished Service Medal